Merlin Hanbury-Tracy (also known as Merlin Charles Sainthill Hanbury-Tracy),  (17 June 1939 – 5 September 2022) was an unelected hereditary British peer, author, and monarchist. In 1941, at the age of two, he succeeded his first cousin once removed, Richard Hanbury-Tracy, 6th Baron Sudeley, to the Barony of Sudeley and until the democratic reforms of House of Lords Act 1999, he sat as an unelected hereditary peer. 

Hanbury-Tracy's reputation was severely damaged in later life by racist comments he made in reports and speeches, alongside comments he made praised the Nazi leader, Adolf Hitler. A member of the reactionary Conservative Party all his adult life, he was also sometimes President and Chairman of the Conservative Monday Club for seventeen years. He was Vice-Chancellor of the International Monarchist League, and President of the Traditional Britain Group.

Early life and education
Merlin Hanbury-Tracy was born on 17 June 1939 to Captain Michael Hanbury-Tracy, a Scots Guards officer, who died from wounds received at Dunkirk, and Colline Annabel, only daughter of Lieutenant-Colonel Collis George Herbert St. Hill, the Royal North Devon Hussars, commander of the 2/5 battalion of Sherwood Foresters, who was also killed by a sniper at Villers-Plouich, France, on 8 July 1917. 

Hanbury-Tracy's parents paid for him to attend Eton College, a local private school in Windsor, England. He later graduated in History from Worcester College, Oxford. Hanbury-Tracy was also sometimes an adjunct lecturer at the University of Bristol. He served his National Service obligations in the ranks of the Scots Guards.

Political Activity

Hanbury-Tracy was a member of the unelected House of Lords for 39 years. He claimed the hereditary position the age of 21 before having started as career (21 is the minimum age one's son can take one's seat in the UK). While Hanbury-Tracy was not responsible for any major legislation, he used his hereditary seat in the House of Lords to put forward several measures that he considered important, most notably the debate to prevent the unlicensed export of historical manuscripts and, in 1981, a Bill to uphold the Book of Common Prayer.

Expulsion from the House of Lords

Hanbury-Tracy was one of the unelected hereditary peers expelled from the Upper House by the House of Lords Act 1999. Faced with losing his hereditary position, Hanbury-Tracy opposed democratic reforms to the House of Lords. Hanbury-Tracyclaimed the House of Lords should be left unreformed, declaring that "If it isn't broken why mend it?" He also said that since he believed inherited titles were "inextricably" tied to the monarchy that it was "odd that they just want to touch one institution and not the other". He also claimed that the House of Lords had developed a 'wealth of experience', though he did not specify the exact nature of this expertise or why it was not replicable. In 1985 he was elected a Vice-Chancellor of the reactionary International Monarchist League.

Since the early 1970s, Hanbury-Tracy had been active in the notorious Conservative Monday Club of which he became president in February 1991. He wrote for them a leading essay on "The Role of Heredity in Politics", produced a Club Policy Paper against Lords Reform in December 1979, and in 1991 they published his booklet titled, and arguing for, The Preservation of the House of Lords, with a foreword by parliamentarian John Stokes.

Racism & Praise of Hitler

Sudelely's reputation was severely damaged by racist comments he made in speeches and reports. On 2 June 2006, The Times quoted Sudeley as stating, in a report of the Monday Club's Annual General Meeting, that "Hitler did well to get everyone back to work". It also reported him saying that "True though the fact may be that some races are superior to others", going on to suggest that such rhetoric might interfere with the Monday Club's hopes of being accepted again in Conservative Party circles. 

In September 2001, the Conservative Party leadership candidate Iain Duncan Smith said the Monday Club was a "viable organisation… in a sense what the party is about". However, six weeks later, after becoming leader, he publicly distanced the party from the Monday Club until it ceased to "promulgate or discuss policies relating to race"; he also indicated that no Conservative MPs should contribute to Right Now!, a quarterly magazine of which Hanbury-Tracy was a Patron, after an article in it described Nelson Mandela as a "terrorist". 

Hanbury-Tracy was also a vice-president of the now-defunct [[Western Goals Institute. 

He was Patron of the Bankruptcy Association (Lloyds Bank foreclosed upon Charles Hanbury-Tracy, 4th Baron Sudeley in 1893, when his debt was covered twice over by large assets) and Convenor of the Forum for Stable Currencies. He was also Lay Patron of the Prayer Book Society and a past President of the Powysland Club.

Hobbies

Hanbury-Tracy once described in Who's Who one of his hobbies as "Ancestor Worship", with "Conversation" being listed in Debrett's. He took great pride in the former family seat of Toddington Manor in Gloucestershire which the family the was later forced to sell.  In its successful blend of the Perpendicular Gothic and Picturesque styles, Toddington is the fore-runner of the Houses of Parliament when the soon-to-be 1st Lord Sudeley was selected as Chairman of the new parliamentary committee to settle upon the design. His contributions based upon Toddington's were accepted and enhanced.<ref>The Sudeleys - Lords of Toddington, 1987, p.232.</ref>

At Easter 1985, in conjunction with the century-old Manorial Society of Great Britain (of which he sat on the Governing Council), Hanbury-Tracy held a conference at his old home, the proceedings published in a volume entitled The Sudeleys - Lords of Toddington, taking the history of his family back to Thomas Becket's murder and ultimately to Charlemagne. On 21 November 2006, he arranged a further conference at the Society of Antiquaries of London on "Visual Aspects of Toddington in the 19th century".

Hanbury-Tracy has written published essays, including a history of English 'gentleman' for a small German pharmaceutical magazine Die Waage,. He also wrote his own history of the House of Lords in which he tried to give ascendancy to its Tory (as opposed to Whig history) interpretation. The book is entitled Peers Through the Mist of Time, and was published by a small independent press called 'Diehard Books'. A launch for his book about the unelected House of Lords took place at the Brooks's Club in London on 28 September 2018. In "Toddington, the Unforgotten Forerunner",  Sudeley tries to tell the story of his family's former home, designed in a blend of Perpendicular Gothic and Picturesque by Charles Hanbury-Tracy, later Chairman of the Commission for the Rebuilding of the Houses of Parliament in the same style, and its tragic and unexplained loss, Diehard Books, 2021. He is also the author of a satire on Greek mythology (published in John Pudney's famous Pick of Today's Short Stories) and a quantity of politically-incorrect short stories mostly published in the London Miscellany magazine. In recent years Sudeley style-edited a definitive monograph on Azerbaijan's architecture, translated from the Russian.

Personal life

Hanbury-Tracy lived in London. He had been married three times and divorced twice.

Hanbury-Tracy married his first wife on 18 January 1980 (marriage dissolved 1988), Elizabeth Mairi Villiers (3 November 1941 – 29 September 2014), daughter of Derek William Charles Keppel, Viscount Bury (heir-apparent of the 9th Earl of Albemarle) and Lady Mairi Vane-Tempest-Stewart (youngest daughter of the 7th Marquess of Londonderry, and ex-wife of Alastair Michael Hyde Villiers, a Partner in Panmure Gordon & Company stockbrokers.

He was married next in 1999 (marriage dissolved 2006) to Margarita Kellett (born 1962), daughter of Nikolai Danko, ex-wife of Lloyd's broker Nigel Kellett.

Hanbury-Tracy married a third time, in 2010, Dr Tatiana Dudina (born 19 August 1950), daughter of Russian Colonel Boris Dudin and Galina Veselovskaya. Dr Dudina holds a doctorate in philology from Moscow State Linguistic University.

Hanbury-Tracy died on 5 September 2022 at the age of 83. He was succeeded in the Barony of Sudeley by his fourth cousin once removed, Nicholas Hanbury-Tracy.

References

Sources
 Copping, Robert, The Monday Club - Crisis and After May 1975, page 25, published by the Current Affairs Information Service, Ilford, Essex, (P/B).
 Sudeley, The Rt. Hon. The Lord, Lords Reform - Why Tamper with the House of Lords, Monday Club publication, December 1979, (P/B).
 Sudeley, The Rt. Hon. The Lord, A Guide to Hailes Church, nr. Winchcombe, Gloucester, 1980, (P/B), 
 Sudeley, The Rt. Hon.The Lord, The Role of Hereditary in Politics, in The Monarchist, January 1982, no.60, Norwich, England.
 Sudeley, The Rt. Hon.The Lord, Becket's Murderer - William de Tracy, in Family History magazine, Canterbury, August 1983, vol.13, no.97, pps: 3 - 36.
 Sudeley, the Rt. Hon.The Lord, essays in The Sudeleys - Lords of Toddington, published by the Manorial Society of Great Britain, London, 1987,(P/B)
 Sudeley, The Rt. Hon.The Lord, The Preservation of The House of Lords Monday Club, London, 1991, (P/B).
 London Evening Standard newspaper, 27 March 1991 - article: An heir of neglect - A Life in the Home of Lord Sudeley (pps:32-33).
 Births, Deaths & Marriages, Family Record Centre, Islington, London.
 Mosley, Charles, (editor) Burke's Peerage, Baronetage, & Knightage 106th edition, Switzerland, (1999), 
 Sudeley, The Rt. Hon.The Lord, The Sudeley Bankruptcy in London Miscellany June 1999 edition.
 OK! magazine, London, issue 175, 20 August 1999, (7-page report on his wedding).
 Mitchell, Austin, M.P., Farewell My Lords, London, 1999, (P/B), 
 Gliddon, Gerald, The Aristocracy and The Great War, Norwich, 2002, 
 Sudeley, The Rt. Hon.The Lord, Usery or Taking Interest for Lending Money, published by the Forum for Stable Currencies, 2004, (P/B).
 Perry, Maria, The House in Berkeley Square'', London,2003.

1939 births
2022 deaths
Alumni of Worcester College, Oxford
Barons in the Peerage of the United Kingdom
Conservative Party (UK) hereditary peers
Fellows of the Society of Antiquaries of London
British monarchists
People educated at Eton College
Politicians from London
Royal North Devon Yeomanry officers
Sudeley